The New York Surf Film Festival is a film festival held in New York City featuring surf films that was held between 2008 and 2013.

History
The New York Surf Film Festival was founded in 2007 by a group of New York surfers. 

It held its inaugural event September 26–28, 2008 at Tribeca Cinemas, with 25 films screened from all over the world, including a special 30th Anniversary screening of Warner Brothers' Big Wednesday directed by John Milius and co-written with Denny Aaberg.

The official website shows details of the 2013 festival.

Submission guidelines
The New York Surf Film Competition is open to independently produced feature-length and short films in the surf genre. In order to be considered for the Festival's Film Competition for U.S and International films, submitted films must have been completed after January 1, 2004. The running time for features must be greater than 30 minutes. Films under 30 minutes in length are eligible for participation in the Short Film Program.

2008 program

Feature films 
The Rocks, directed by Mark Temme
Peel: The Peru Project, directed by Wes Brown
Musica Surfica, directed by Mick Sowry
One Winter Story, directed by Elizabeth Pepin
Sliding Liberia, directed by Britton Cailhouette 
Archy, directed by Bill Ballard
Out There, a film by the Teton Gravity Project
Under the Sun, directed by Cyrus Sutton 
Bustin Down the Door, directed by Jeremy Gosch
Between the Lines, directed by Ty Ponder

Short films 
Surf Noir, directed by Suyen Mosely
The Ghosts Are Calling, directed by Andrew Kidman 
June, directed by Spencer Driggs
Commune, directed by Matt Wesson
Distant Shores, directed by Matt Katsolis
Bonzer: The Mothership, directed by the Campbell Brothers 
Evening Africa, directed by Dustin Miller
Pulp Poo and Perfection, directed by Joshua Berry
Drawing Lines, directed by Josh Bolton
Runman's:The Bruce Movie, directed by Ray Kleiman
Doctor Blood Family Surf, directed by Charles Smith
Lapsed Catholics, directed by Todd Stewart
Rip Tide, directed by Dennis Jarvy
Kooks, directed by Guy Fiorita
Invasion from Planet C, directed by David Potter

Winners
Musica Surfica, 2008 Best Feature Award
Distant Shores, 2008 Best Short Award
The Rocks, 2008 Viewers Choice Award

2009 program 
The 2009 program included the following feature films:
Beyond The Dream: Joey Buran Story directed by Matt Katsolis and Nic McLean
Sea of Darkness directed by Michael Oblowitz
Power Of Three directed by Ross Cairns
Last Hope directed by Andrew Kidman
Hanging Five directed by Christopher Cutri
Searching for Michael Peterson directed by Australian documentary maker Jolyon Hoff 
Waveriders directed by Joel Conroy
The Women and The Waves directed by Heather Hudson and Peck Euwer 
The Drifter directed by Taylor Steele
Out of Place directed by Scott Ditzenberger and Darrin McDonald
Whitewash directed by Ted Woods
Clay Marzo:Just Add Water directed by Jamie Tierney
Surfing 50 States directed by Stefan Hunt and Jonno Durrant
Mengejar Ombak directed by Dave Arnold & Tyrone Lebon
Modern Collective directed by Kai Neville
A Pleasant Surprise directed by Kyle Pahlow
The Endless Summer directed by Bruce Brown
Innermost Limits of Pure Fun directed by George Greenough

Winners
The 2009 winners were:
Sea of Darkness, 2009 Best Feature Award
All Points South directed by Joshua Berry, 2009 Best Short Award
Out of Place, 2009 Viewers Choice Award

References

External links
 (2013)

Film festivals in New York City
American surfing films
Surfing in the United States
Surfing organizations